The table below shows all results of Citroën World Rally Team in World Rally Championship.

WRC results

Group B era

WRC era
 
Notes:

J-WRC results

References
 results at juwra.com

External links
Citroën Racing homepage
Citroën at wrc.com 

results
World Rally Championship constructor results